"Tick Tock" (stylized as "TICK TOCK") is a song by Mexican singer Thalía with Colombian singer Farina and Mexican singer Sofía Reyes. It was released by Sony Music on October 29, 2020 as the third single from Thalía's seventeenth studio album Desamorfosis.

Background and release
The song along with the music video was officially released on October 29, 2020 as part of the 6th and final episode of the web series Latin Music Queens which stars the 3 singers. This marked the third time the Thalía and Farina collaborated after releasing Estoy Soltera a few months prior with Peruvian singer Leslie Shaw and on Ten Cuidao just 3 weeks prior.

Commercial performance
The song peak at number 9 on the US Latin Pop Digital Songs Sales chart in Billboard. It also entered the Latin Pop Airplay charts in that country and was nominated for a Premio Juventud.

Music video
The music video for the song was released on the same day. The video directed by Mike Ho and features the singers in futuristic outfits with western inspiration. The single achieved global success, adding in just a few weeks more than ten million views in the video clip.

Charts

Awards and nominations
The song was nominated for Girl Power Collaboration at the Premios Juventud in 2021.

References

Thalía songs
2020 songs
2020 singles
Spanish-language songs